Operation Clean-up, also known as Operation Blue Fox, was an armed military intelligence program led by the Sindh Police and Pakistan Rangers, with an additional assistance from the Pakistan Army and its related intelligence agencies. Planned by the FIA, Intelligence Bureau and launched the directives of Prime Minister Nawaz Sharif in 1992, the program was more strictly pursued by upcoming Prime Minister Benazir Bhutto in 1993–94, as part of her internal policies.

Its objective was to "cleanse" Karachi city of "anti-social" elements. The program targeted the Muttahida Qaumi Movement over the controversy regarding the Jinnahpur plan— which supposedly planned on having the city of Karachi break away from Pakistan.

Background

Political dynamics in 1980s
The Muttahida Qaumi Movement (denoted as MQM) is a centre-left and liberal political party which was founded in 1984 by its activist leader, Altaf Hussain who was a student at the University of Karachi in the 1970s. According to the memoirs of General Mirza Beg, the MQM had its support from President General Zia-ul-Haq since its very early foundation in 1984, in a view to sideline the JeI in Karachi and PPP in rural Sindh. Such claims had been dismissed by party's convener Imran Farooq. MQM took part in local government elections and participated well in 1985 general elections, initially becoming part of military–technocratic government of PresidentGeneral Zia-ul-Haq. After death of President Zia-ul-Haq, MQM contested in 1988 general elections, acquiring considerable political leverage with 13 seats in parliament.  MQM was part of PPP-led government of Benazir Bhutto but its repressive persuasion of repatriation of Biharis from Bangladesh camps soured the relations between each other. MQM went on to support the "vote of no confidence" against Benazir Bhutto which took the incumbency by surprise. As early as 1988–89, the political problems in Karachi began to arise and reached its climax in 1990 when Sindh Police opened fire on Muhajir locale in Hyderabad city. The ensuing violence led to the events dismissing Benazir Bhutto from the office.

After coming in power as a result of 1990 general elections, the MQM re-demonstrated its political power in Sindh as part of the IDA government led by Nawaz Sharif. During this time, violence arose with the disagreements between one faction led by Afaq Ahmed and Altaf Hussain of MQM. MQM was later subdued by Nawaz Sharif in 1991 due to a brief clash of ideology.

Planning a military operation in Karachi
In 1992, a program's studies for an Army led operation in Karachi were concluded under the Director-General of the Intelligence Bureau, Brigadier (retired) Imtiaz Ahmed as codename: Operation Clean-up, recommending the protocol. On personal initiatives of Prime Minister Nawaz Sharif, Clean-up protocol was initiated under Imtiaz Ahmed and the Pakistan Rangers, focusing on taking measures against the decoits in rural Sindh, not specific political parties. According to the sources, the program's protocol was to last six months, deadline was until June 1992.

Operation Clean-up

The program went in cold storage after Sharif was dismissed but again came in effect and revival after the 1993 general elections which saw Benazir Bhutto coming in power and MQM winning the provisional elections decisively. The proposal was put forward and Benazir Bhutto renamed the program's protocol as "Blue Fox in 1993 and more aggressively persuade with the program. Among the reasons given for the launching of the Blue Fox were the Jinnahpur affair and the Major Kaleem Case in Karachi that occurred in 1993. The street fighting with the PPP continued in rural Karachi with the PPP's controversial decision of forming of Malir District in 1994.

Continuation of the operation
After the Nawaz government fell, the anti-MQM operation continued into the new Benazir Bhutto government. The army recognised that the program's protocol actually took place during the Government of Prime Minister Benazir Bhutto. The diameter and focus of the program was widened to Pakistan Armed Forces when the 25th Mechanized Division of V Corps (for ground support) and the ISI (on intelligence) was invited by Benazir Bhutto. The army's search and destroy operation led to the discovery of arm caches and torture chambers in elsewhere in Karachi. The gun and street fighting in Karachi increased the Muhajir Sindh violence. Lieutenant-General Naseer Akhtar and Major-General Safdar Ali Khan, assisting Brigadier Imtiaz Ahmed, directly reported to the government on the course of actions. In December 1993, Defence minister Aftab Mirani maintained that the army operation in Sindh "will continue as long as it is needed." In a press release in January 1994, Interior Minister, Major-General (retired) Naseerullah Babar, added in that "Operation Clean-Up" was likely to continue until June.

During its final phases on 19 May 1994, Prime minister Benazir Bhutto chaired a meeting with Chief minister of Sindh Abdullah shah, Interior minister Naseerullah Babar, chief of army staff General Waheed Kakar and other key civilian and military officials at General Headquarters (GHQ) to decide on the modalities of Operation Clean-up in Sindh; operation to be carried out by the Army Rangers with full backing by the Army.

Halt and legacy
Ending in 1994, the period is regarded as the bloodiest period in Karachi's history, with thousands killed or gone missing in the fighting. In May 1995, arm clashes again broke out between the MQM and the Sindh Police managed by the PPP. Benazir Bhutto's steps towards the counterinsurgency did, however, bring some calm in Karachi by the spring of 1996. Over this issue, Murtaza Bhutto was notably gunned down in a police encounter with the Sindh Police. Within seven-week, President Farooq Leghari dismissed the government of Benazir Bhutto, primarily charging the issue of Murtaza Bhutto and the killings of MQM workers. MQM again participated well in 1997 general elections and redemonstrated its political leverage in the parliament. Furthermore, the program came to its final halt in end years of 1996 after the dismissal of Benazir Bhutto's government.

Although over 30 years have passed since the arrests or disappearance of MQM workers, families of the missing people have registered cases in the Supreme Court of Pakistan and are still searching for their loved ones.

See also
Jinnahpur

References

External links
 Rise of the MQM in Pakistan: Politics of Ethnic Mobilization, Farhat Haq, Asian Survey, Vol. 35, No. 11 (Nov. 1995), pp. 990–1004, University of California Press
 Ethnicity and State Power in Pakistan: The Karachi Crisis, Moonis Ahmar, Asian Survey, Vol. 36, No. 10 (Oct. 1996), pp. 1031–1048, Published by: University of California Press
 A History of Pakistan and its Origins, pg 35, Christophe Jaffrelot
 "What happened to the 92 cops who disappeared after 1992?"

History of Pakistan
History of Sindh (1947–present)
Muhajir history
Political repression in Pakistan
Politics of Karachi
Clean-up
Police operations in Pakistan
Clean-up
Clean-up
Nawaz Sharif administration
Clean-up
Government of Benazir Bhutto
Muttahida Qaumi Movement
Persecution of Muhajirs